George Ernest Ingle (1895–1964) was an Anglican suffragan bishop.

Born into an ecclesiastical family in 1895, he was educated at Felsted and Jesus College, Cambridge. After wartime service with the Royal Norfolk Regiment, he embarked on an ecclesiastical career with a curacy at St Peter's, Cranley Gardens, Hammersmith. Following this, he was Chaplain to the London Irish Rifles then of the British Embassy Church, Paris. A long period as a master at his old school, Felsted, was followed by short posts as Vicar of St John's, Greenhill, Harrow and as Rural Dean of the British Zone of Germany before he was elevated to the episcopate as the third Bishop of Fulham, a post he held for only seven years. Translated to Willesden, he died on 10 June 1964.

Notes

External links
Photo of St Peter’s Church, Cranley Gardens
St John's, Greenhill - church website

1895 births
People educated at Felsted School
Alumni of Jesus College, Cambridge
Bishops of Fulham
20th-century Church of England bishops
Bishops of Willesden
1964 deaths
Royal Norfolk Regiment soldiers
British military chaplains
British Army personnel of World War I